Logan Botanic Garden is a botanical garden near Port Logan on the Rhins of Galloway, at the south-western tip of Scotland.

The Botanic Garden was established in 1869 and was gifted to Royal Botanic Garden Edinburgh in 1969. It is now operated as part of the Royal Botanic Garden Edinburgh's Living Collection.

The area has a mild climate due to the influence of the North Atlantic drift. The combination of this and the sheltered aspect of the gardens enables plants to be cultivated which would not normally survive outdoors in Scotland, with species from as far away as Chile, Vietnam and New Zealand all thriving in Logan's borders. Features of Logan include a sizeable Walled Garden complete with formal fish pond, an eco-Conservatory housing a variety of South African plants, Tasmanian Creek area, and Discovery Centre which houses various exhibitions throughout the seasons.

The garden is also home to Plant Heritage's National Plant Collections of Gunnera, Griselinia and Leptospermum.

See also

 List of gardens in Scotland

References

External links
Logan Botanic Garden at the website of the Royal Botanic Garden, Edinburgh

Botanical gardens in Scotland
Inventory of Gardens and Designed Landscapes
Gardens in Dumfries and Galloway
1869 establishments in Scotland
Royal Botanic Garden Edinburgh
Rhins of Galloway